Miljenko Jergović (born 28 May 1966) is a prominent Bosnian writer.

Biography
Born in Sarajevo, SR Bosnia and Herzegovina, SFR Yugoslavia to Croatian parents, Jergović received his M.A. in literature from the Sarajevo University. While at high-school, he started working as a journalist in printed and electronic media, as a contributor to literary and youth magazines, and was soon recognized as Croatia's media correspondent from Sarajevo.

Writing

Jergović's novels treat his family members and their histories. He is also a journalist and has published a collection of his articles in Historijska čitanka (A Reader in History, 1996).

Jergović writes a column in the Serbian daily Politika, for Vreme magazine and a regular column in the Croatian daily Jutarnji list entitled Sumnjivo lice (trans. "suspicious character", lit. "suspicious face").

Works
His novel Buick Riviera was made into a movie in 2008 by filmmaker Goran Rušinović, and the two were in turn awarded the Golden Arena for Best Screenplay. According to the author himself, it is a "novella" set in North American countryside, dealing with the conflict of a Serbian refugee from Bosnia, probably a war criminal, and a Muslim refugee who had spent twenty years in the United States. Its heroes, who always carry with them their native lore, their religion and their mentality, though they have numerous reasons for feelings of love and understanding of others, become victims of their own inability to rise above their national background, above their old hatreds and the burden of historical conflicts.

Miljenko Jergovic wrote another novel or "documented diary" – "Volga, Volga", a book about car and his driver. This is a complicated story about guilt and death, the Yugoslav war and internal conflicts. And as is Jergovic great storyteller, he starts with what the outside: Volga is not only black but glossy black like the piano.  Reading the book makes reader realize the main effect of storytelling: war destroys, stories are kept. Focal characteristics of the book are desire and strangeness, sadness and anger. Jergović’ car is a"documentary fantasy" and the story is about the generation living a lie.  Jergović’ Yugoslavia lost in dreams of acting, the desire for truth is opposed illusions and dreams, lies and legends. Jergovic the master of melancholy presents driving as a journey into the past, awakens memories of the companions, the times of sadness and loneliness. Central figure in the novel is Jalal Pljevljak, who is the experienced driver and a Muslim believer, whose faith prohibits the consumption of alcohol, drunk, and so risked disaster. Although the reader gets the key to a mysterious accident, second impression prevails much greater issue: the uncertainty about where the boundaries between fact, facts, legends, dreams and lies. The truth about things, it shows the contrasting perspectives of game storytelling, not just a matter of personal integrity and identity. Thus, the author briefly illuminates the history of the former Yugoslavia. As the scene of religious, ethnic and political relations and conflict former multinational federation determines the flow and actions, so, for example, accused Pljevljak, for example, both Croat and Muslim. At the end of the wars in the nineties it was very popular among intellectuals and yellow press to relativize the guilt of the pre-war crime and surrender it to forgetfulness. So, the case Pljevljak for a reader is a metaphor of the fate of the whole country.,

Literary circles

A number of private conflicts in literary circles drew public attention to disagreement among famous writers. Namely, issues in the Croatian Writers' Society created fragmentation and an alleged unjust disqualification of writers on political grounds. Over the course of his career, Jergović was involved in these issues, as were many other noteworthy writers. In October 2002, Jergović was elected to the Croatian Writers' Society board of directors. In 2003, there was criticism that one of CWS founders, Velimir Visković, was judging CWS members on political grounds. This was revealed when Drago Štambuk pointed out Visković's former association with the HDZ government. In April 2006, Jergović became involved in a literary dispute with Dražen Katunarić over Jergović's text on Houellebecqu, which Jergović's considered charlatan for being based on the Qur'an.  Katunarić said that such texts with a Sarajevan and Islamic basis are not accepted in Zagreb. To which Jergović responded for him to put a gun to his head. This controversy encouraged Zdravko Zima to resign his membership in the Croatian Writers' Society because he felt the leadership wasn't distancing themselves from the attacks on Katunarić. In April 2007, Jergović himself withdrew from CWS. Jergović said that the society contrasted his attitude to Croatian literature and literature in general. A number of other writers cut ties with the association in a similar fashion, including Ivan Lovrenović who resigned because he felt Velimir Visković's disqualification called for the real and symbolic dismissal of Jergović in 2011.

In 2009, Visković made public claims about Jergović reaffirming Chetniks in Serbia and setting out to market books for a Serbian market. Visković made these claims in response to an interview Jergović gave. Some questioned whether the reason for the conflict with Jergović was Visković's life project – the Encyclopedia of Croatian Literature. When CWS members asked Visković to apologize, he refused, citing years of insults to him, his family and other prominent writers.

Personal life
Born in Sarajevo in 1966, Jergović spent half of his life in his hometown. He even spent the first year of the Bosnian War, more precisely the Siege of Sarajevo there, before moving to Zagreb in 1993.

Jergović has been known as an avid supporter of Sarajevo football club FK Željezničar, whose fan he has been since he was even a kid, even having a membership card of the club as well, renewing it in July 2019.

Awards
In 2012, he received the Angelus Central European Literature Award for his book Srda pjeva, u sumrak, na Duhove ("Srda Sings at Dusk On Pentecost") and in 2018 he won the Georg Dehio Book Prize.

Bibliography
 Opservatorija Varšava, poem collection, 1988
 Uči li noćas neko u ovom gradu japanski?, poem collection, 1992
 Himmel Comando, 1992
 Sarajevski Marlboro, short stories, 1994
English-language edition, Sarajevo Marlboro, translated by Stela Tomasevic. New York: Archipelago Books, 2004.
 Karivani, short stories, 1995
 Preko zaleđenog mosta, 1996
 Naci bonton, 1998
 Mama Leone, short stories, 1999, Zoro Sarajevo 
 Sarajevski Marlboro, Karivani i druge priče, short stories, 1999, Durieux Zagreb, 
 Historijska čitanka, short stories, 2000, 
 Kažeš anđeo, 2000
 Hauzmajstor Šulc, short stories, 2001
 Buick Riviera, novel, 2002, 
 Dvori od oraha, novel, 2003, 
English-language edition, The Walnut Mansion, translated by Stephen M. Dickey and Janja Pavetic Dickey. New Haven: Yale University Press. 2017.
 Rabija i sedam meleka, short stories, 2004, 
 Historijska čitanka 2, 2004, 
 Inšallah Madona, inšallah, novel, 2004, 
 Glorija in excelsis, novel, 2005, Durieux Zagreb, 
 Žrtve sanjaju veliku ratnu pobjedu, newspaper chronicles, 2006, Durieux Zagreb, 
 Ruta Tannenbaum, novel, 2006, Durieux Zagreb, 
 Drugi poljubac Gite Danon, selected stories, 2007, VBZ, Zagreb, 
 Freelander, novel, 2007, Ajfelov most, Sarajevo/Zagreb 
 Srda pjeva, u sumrak, na Duhove, novel, 2009, Rende, Beograd, 
 Krađa, 2009
 Transantlantic mail, mail exchange with Semezdin Mehmedinović 2008–09, VBZ, Zagreb, 2009 
 Volga, Volga, novel, 2009, Naklada Ljevak, Zagreb 
 Psi na jezeru, novel, 2010, Naklada Ljevak, Zagreb 
 Otac, novel, 2010
 Rod, novel, 2013
English-language edition: Kin, translated by Russell Scott Valentino. New York: Archipelago Books, 2021.
 Tušt i tma, correspondence with Svetislav Basara, Laguna, Beograd, 2014
 Levijeva Tkaonica Svile, 2014
 Sarajevo, plan grada, 2015
 Drugi krug, correspondence with Svetislav Basara, Laguna, Beograd, 2015
 Imenik lijepih vještina, 2018
 Selidba, 2018
 Herkul, 2019
 Bajakovo-Batrovci, correspondence with Svetislav Basara, 2020
 Imenik lijepih vještina II, 2020

Annotations

References

External links

1966 births
Living people
Journalists from Sarajevo
Croats of Bosnia and Herzegovina
Bosnia and Herzegovina male writers
Bosnia and Herzegovina novelists
Bosnia and Herzegovina short story writers
Male novelists
Male short story writers
Golden Arena winners